Toshitsugu Mori (born 22 December 1969) is a Japanese former professional tennis player.

Born in Higashiōsaka, Mori played on the professional tour during the 1990s and had a best singles ranking of 579 in the world. He represented Japan at the 1991 Summer Universiade and won a doubles title at the All-Japan Championships in 1994. Both of his two ATP Tour singles main draw appearance came in 1994, at the Japan Open and the Tokyo Indoor tournaments. He featured in the qualifying draw in three editions of the Australian Open.

References

External links
 
 

1969 births
Living people
Japanese male tennis players
People from Higashiōsaka
Competitors at the 1991 Summer Universiade
20th-century Japanese people